César Hugo Couceiro (born April 18, 1970 in Buenos Aires) is a former Argentine football defender. In his native country he played for senior clubs such as Huracán, Nueva Chicago and Atlanta. He also made a spell in the Liga de Fútbol Profesional Boliviano with Blooming where he was part of back-to-back national titles in 1998 and 1999.

During 2000 he played in Mexico for a short period with Veracruz before returning to Bolivia to rejoin the celestes. In 2002, he transferred to Bolivian side Unión Central, but after a few weeks into the season he decided to go back to Argentina where he signed for second division club Almagro. The following season, he played for Deportivo Laferrere, a team from the Primera C Metropolitana before culminating his career with Villa Dálmine in 2006.

Club titles

External links
 
 

1970 births
Living people
Footballers from Buenos Aires
Argentine footballers
Association football midfielders
Club Atlético Huracán footballers
Club Atlético Atlanta footballers
Nueva Chicago footballers
Club Blooming players
Argentine expatriate sportspeople in Mexico
Club Almagro players
C.D. Veracruz footballers
Expatriate footballers in Bolivia
Expatriate footballers in Mexico
Argentine expatriate sportspeople in Bolivia
Unión Tarija players